In architecture, a latilla is a lath used in traditional adobe construction (see viga).

Latilla may also refer to
Eugenio Latilla (1808–1861), Anglo-Italian painter
Gaetano Latilla (1711–1788), Italian opera composer
Gino Latilla (1924–2011), Italian singer